"Something Different" is a single by American boy band Why Don't We. It was released on April 21, 2017, and is the lead single from their second EP of the same name.

The song peaked at number 22 on the US Bubbling Under Hot 100 Singles chart.

In 2018, the song was ranked seventieth by Billboard in their compilation of the 100 Greatest Boyband Songs of All Time.

Music video
The music video was uploaded on YouTube on April 27, 2017. It was directed by Logan Paul and has over 50 million views.

Remixes 
On September 8, 2017, remixes of the song by producers Boehm, Feenixpawl, and B-Sights were released digitally.

Track listing

Charts

Release history

References

2017 singles
2017 songs
Why Don't We songs
Songs written by Candice Pillay